Blackburn is a rapidly growing village northwest of Aberdeen, Scotland, and is situated in Aberdeenshire. Local amenities include an industrial estate, primary school, nursing home, post office, Starbucks Drive Thru, local Co-op and a community hall which was publicly opened by The Princess Royal on 2 March 2005.

History

Governance 
Blackburn is part of the  West Aberdeenshire and Kincardine county constituency for UK Parliament elections.

For Scottish elections Blackburn is part of the  Aberdeenshire West constituency and part of the  North East Scotland electoral region.

Blackburn is within the East Garioch ward which forms part of the Garioch administrative area of  Aberdeenshire Council.

Fintray and Kinellar Community Council represents the views of residents to Aberdeenshire Council and other public bodies.

Geography 
Located 8.5 miles (14km) WNW of Aberdeen and 92 miles (150km) NNE of Edinburgh, Blackburn is a village just north of Backhill Wood where small streams form and join into Black burn where the village takes its name. The burn runs north to join the River Don.

Economy 
Blackburn Industrial Estate is located at the south end of the village adjacent to the A96.

Culture and community

Kinellar Community Hall 
Kinellar Community Hall was opened on the 2nd of March 2005. It is used for sports, birthday parties and social events.

Sport 
Blackburn AFC formed in 1947 and are a Aberdeenshire AFA Division Two (East) team.

Education 
Blackburn has one school, Kinellar Primary School, which provides primary education for local pupils. Pupils travel by bus to neighbouring Kemnay and attend Kemnay Academy for secondary education.

On New Year's Day 2016, there was a fire at Kinellar School, reported to police at around 2.15am. Significant damage was caused to nursery and P1 classes. A 16 year old was arrested and charged in relation to the fire. The old school was demolished, and a new £12 million school was built on its site. It includes a nursery, games area, community park and additional car parking.

Religious sites 

Kinellar Parish Church is located just north of the village but is no longer in use.

References 

Villages in Aberdeenshire